Metriini is a tribe of ground beetles in the family Carabidae. There are at least three genera and about six described species in Metriini.

Genera
These genera belong to the tribe Metriini:
 Metrius Eschscholtz, 1829  (2 species, found in North America)
 Sinometrius Wrase & J.Schmidt, 2006  (3 species, found in China)
 † Kryzhanovskiana Kataev & Kirejtshuk, 2019  Burmese amber, Myanmar, Cenomanian

References

Paussinae